WVPM is a public radio formatted broadcast radio station licensed to Morgantown, West Virginia, serving North-Central West Virginia and Southwestern Pennsylvania.  WVPM is owned and operated by West Virginia Educational Broadcasting Authority.

WVPM is licensed to broadcast in the (digital) HD format.

References

External links
West Virginia Public Broadcasting Online

NPR member stations
VPM